Santa Baby 2: Christmas Maybe is a 2009 made-for-television Christmas comedy film and a sequel to Santa Baby. It premiered on ABC Family on December 13, 2009 during the channel's 25 Days of Christmas programming block. Jenny McCarthy, Lynne Griffin, Jessica Parker Kennedy, Richard Side, and Gabe Khouth all reprise their roles from the original film.

Plot
Santa finds himself in the midst of a late-in-life crisis. He has grown tired of the responsibilities of his job and is ready to pass on the reins to his business-minded daughter Mary, who feels torn between the family business and running her own high-stakes firm in New York City, along with balancing a relationship with the love of her life, Luke.

The situation gets increasingly dire when Teri, an ambitious new arrival to the North Pole, sows dissension at the workshop in an effort to take over Christmas. However, it is revealed that Teri is an elf, bitter at Mary and was trying to take over Christmas. Mary manages to stop her and take care of the yearly rounds around the world.

Cast
 Jenny McCarthy as Mary Class/Claus
 Dean McDermott as Luke Jessup
 Rohan Campbell as young Luke
 Paul Sorvino as Santa Claus
 Lynne Griffin as Mrs. Claus
 Kelly Stables as Teri
 Jessica Parker Kennedy as Lucy The Elf
 Richard Side as Gary The Elf
 Gabe Khouth as Skip The Elf
 James Higuchi as Dave The Elf
 Kris Holden-Ried as Colin
 Miguelito Macario Andaluz as Sandy
 Holly Ann Emerson as Young Woman
 Brendan Hunter as Jazz Club Announcer
 Leah MacDonald as Gift Wrapper

Premiere
Santa Baby 2: Christmas Maybe premiered on December 13, 2009 as part of ABC Family's annual 25 Days of Christmas programming event. The film received 3.8 million viewers on its original broadcast with a 1.2 18–49 rating.

Filming
Santa Baby 2: Christmas Maybe was filmed in February 2009 in Calgary, Alberta, Canada.
Ivan Sergei and George Wendt did not reprise their roles as Luke Jessup and Santa Claus, respectively, being replaced by Dean McDermott and Paul Sorvino.

Soundtrack
Alexa Vega sang the lead track from the movie, "Christmas Is the Time to Say I Love You" and shot a music video for the song which premiered during the 25 Days of Christmas. Amber Stevens recorded a new version of the title song, "Santa Baby". The songs are featured on the compilation album Songs to Celebrate 25 Days of Christmas, released on November 3, 2009 by Walt Disney Records.

Home media
Santa Baby 2: Christmas Maybe was released on DVD on October 12, 2010.

See also
 List of Christmas films
 Santa Claus in film

References

External links 
 

ABC Family original films
Santa Claus in film
American Christmas films
Christmas television films
Television sequel films
2009 television films
2009 films
Santa Claus in television
Films directed by Ron Underwood
2000s Christmas films